The 1980 UCI Juniors Track World Championships were the sixth annual Junior World Championship for track cycling held in Mexico City, Mexico in August 1980. It was the third successive championship to be held in the Americas.

The Championships had five events for men only, Sprint, Points race, Individual pursuit, Team pursuit and 1 kilometre time trial. Maic Malchow of East Germany and Dainis Leipinch of the Soviet Union were the most successful cyclists, winning the sprint double and pursuit double respectively.

Events

Medal table

References

UCI Juniors Track World Championships
1980 in track cycling
Track cycling
International cycle races hosted by Mexico